Michael E. McCormick is Corbin A. McNeill Professor Emeirtus of the Department of Naval Architecture and Ocean Engineering at the U. S. Naval Academy. He is one of the pioneers of modern wave energy research.

He began his career in 1958 as a  hydrodynamicist at the U. S. Navy's David Taylor Model Basin. His early work there 
was in the area of hydroelasticity, working with Dr. David A. Jewell. Later, in 1964 his work was in the area of boundary-layer induced vibrations, working with Dr. Mark Harrison and Dr. Gabriel
Boehler.  In 1961, he
left DTMB and joined the mechanical engineering faculty at Swarthmore College with a one-year appointment. He returned to Swarthmore in 1976 as visiting scholar in engineering. His teaching and 
research continued at the Catholic University of America, Trinity College (Hartford), the U. S. Naval Academy and Johns Hopkins University. He was at the Naval Academy for  27 years, and at Johns Hopkins as a research professor of civil engineering for 10 years.
Prof. McCormick’s research efforts also resulted in electrolytic drag reduction of marine vehicles, analysis of ocean wave energy conversion systems and wave-powered desalination of sea water using hinged-raft systems (working with Dr. Peter McCabe in Ireland). He was also fortunate to work with Prof. Rameswar Bhattacharyya in co-editing two book series and the journal Ocean Engineering.

Education
B.A. (Mathematics & Physics) American University,
M.S.E. (Engineering Mechanics) Catholic University of America,
Ph.D. (Mechanical Engineering) Catholic University of America,
Ph.D. (Civil Engineering) Trinity College, Dublin,
Sc.D. (Engineering-Science) Trinity College, Dublin

Books
, 178 pp.
,  256 pp.
, 256 pp.
, 573 pp.

External links 

Living people
Alumni of Trinity College Dublin
Catholic University of America alumni
Year of birth missing (living people)